José Kurt Fernández Cisternas (February 23, 1928 – November 5, 2009) was a Chilean footballer who played as a forward for the Chile national team in the 1950s. He represented the national team in the 1957 South American Championship, scoring three goals.

References

External links
 

1928 births
2009 deaths
Chilean footballers
Association football forwards
Chile international footballers